Never Said Goodbye is the second solo studio album by Welsh singer-songwriter Cerys Matthews. It was released on 21 August 2006 by Rough Trade Records. Matthews co-produced the album with Ben Elkins and Stuart Sikes.

The album received generally positive reviews from music critics, who noted its folk influences and "expansive" sound compared with its predecessor, Cockahoop. Never Said Goodbye peaked at no. 1 on the UK Independent Albums chart.

Release and promotion 
"Open Roads" was released as the album's lead single on 7 August 2006. The maxi single included covers of "Soul Love" by David Bowie and "Grace Cathedral Hill" by The Decemberists. Ahead of the album's release, Matthews embarked on a UK tour which began on 27 July 2006 at Llangollen Town Hall and concluded with a headline slot at Cardiff Big Weekend festival on 6 August 2006.

Critical reception 

Sharon Mawer of AllMusic gave Never Said Goodbye a mixed review, noting its "pleasant folky numbers" though opining that various moments are "just too slow". Simon Price of The Independent described the album as a more "confident affair" than Matthews' previous album Cockahoop, and "a polite, bijou piece of work which rewards your attention but never demands it." Nicole Keiper of The Tennessean described Never Said Goodbye as a "far more pop-rocked up affair" than its predecessor. Naomi West of The Daily Telegraph opined that the album is "huge [and] expansive of spirit and sound" featuring "songs backed with dense arrangements of pounding drums, eccentric backing vocals and squirling organs".

Track listing

Credits
Credits adapted from the liner notes of Never Said Goodbye.

Musicians

Cerys Matthews - vocals, guitars
Kevin Teel - guitars
Gruff Rhys - acoustic guitar (track 11), vocals (tracks 3 & 11)
Matt Martin - acoustic guitar (track 7), percussion (tracks 7 & 11)
William Tyler - acoustic guitar (track 11)
Mason Neely - drums (all tracks except 2, 10 & 11)
Jeremy Lutito - drums (tracks 2 & 10)
Brad Pemberton - drums (track 11)
Byron House - bass (tracks 1-6, 8-9)
Jeff Irwin - bass (tracks 7, 10, 11), euphonium (track 6)
James Haggerty - bass (track 10)
Ben Elkins - keyboards, backing vocals, programming
Troy Johnson - additional piano (track 11)
Eric Darken - percussion
Todd Kemp - additional percussion (track 11)
Janice Corder, Everett Drake, Ann McRary - backing vocals (tracks 2, 8 & 11)
Sam Ashworth - backing vocals (track 4)
Lloyd Barry, Vinnie Ciesieski - trumpets
Roy Agee - trombone
Jay Phillips - trombone (track 6)

Production
Producers - Cerys Matthews, Stuart Sikes, Ben Elkins
Engineers - Stuart Sikes, Jeremy Ferguson
Arrangers - Ben Elkins, Cerys Matthews
Mixer - Jeremy Ferguson
Mastering - Andrew Mendelson
A&R - Seth Riddle

Charts

References

2006 albums
Cerys Matthews albums
Rough Trade Records albums